The TR-1 Temp (Temp-S, meaning 'Speed') was a mobile theatre ballistic missile developed and deployed by the Soviet Union during the Cold War.  It was assigned the NATO reporting name SS-12 Scaleboard and carried the industrial designation 9M76 and the GRAU index 9К76.  A modified version was initially identified by NATO as a new design and given the SS-22 reporting name, but later recognized it as merely a variant of the original and maintained the name Scaleboard. The Temp entered service in the mid-1960s.

The TR-1 was designed as a mobile weapon to give theatre (Front) commanders nuclear strike capability.  The weapon used the same mobile launcher (MAZ-543) as the R-17 Elbrus missile but had an environmental protective cover that split down the middle and was only opened when the missile was ready to fire. All were decommissioned in 1988–1989 as part of the INF treaty banning such weapons.

Operators
 The Soviet Armed Forces were the only operator of the TR-1 Temp. It was also placed in countries of Warsaw Pact for example Hranice (Military area Libava) (39) in Czechoslovakia, and Königsbrück (19), Bischofswerda (8), Waren (22) and Wokuhl (5) in East Germany. Its active reach from there covered whole West Germany, parts of Scandinavia, France and Netherlands.

See also 
 MGM-31 Pershing and Pershing II – comparable U. S. theatre nuclear missiles
 List of missiles
 Ghaznavi
 Abdali-I
 Shaheen-I
 J-600T Yıldırım
 SOM
 Bora
 Fateh-313
 Qiam 1
 Al-Hussein
 Nasr
 Zelzal
 Tondar-69
 Burkan-1
 RT-21 Temp 2S

External links 
 Global Security: TR-1
 Stationing (INF, memorandum of understanding) (in German)

References

 Hogg, Ian (2000). Twentieth-Century Artillery. Friedman/Fairfax Publishers. 

Theatre ballistic missiles
Cold War missiles of the Soviet Union
Votkinsk Machine Building Plant products
Military equipment introduced in the 1960s